Phyllurus isis, also known commonly as the Mount Blackwood leaf-tailed gecko and the Mount Jukes broad-tailed gecko, is a species of gecko, a lizard in the family Carphodactylidae. The species is endemic to Mount Blackwood and Mount Jukes in mideastern Queensland, Australia.

Etymology
The specific name, isis, refers to the ancient Egyptian goddess Isis.

Description

Reproduction
P. isis is oviparous.

References

Further reading
Cogger H (2014). Reptiles and Amphibians of Australia, Seventh Edition. Clayton, Victoria, Australia: CSIRO Publishing. xxx + 1,033 pp. . (Phyllurus isis, p. 274).
Couper PJ, Covacevich JA, Moritz C (1993). "A review of the leaf-tailed geckos endemic to eastern Australia: a new genus, four new species, and other new data". Memoirs of the Queensland Museum 34 (1): 95–124. (Phyllurus isis, new species, pp. 113–115).
Wilson, Steve; Swan, Gerry (2013). A Complete Guide to Reptiles of Australia, Fourth Edition. Sydney: New Holland Publishers. 522 pp. .

Phyllurus
Geckos of Australia
Endemic fauna of Australia
Reptiles described in 1993
Taxa named by Patrick J. Couper
Taxa named by Jeanette Covacevich
Taxa named by Craig Moritz